Antaeola is a genus of moths belonging to the subfamily Olethreutinae of the family Tortricidae, with a single species found in Sri Lanka.

Species
Antaeola antaea (Meyrick, 1912)

See also
List of Tortricidae genera

References

External links
tortricidae.com

Tortricidae genera
Monotypic moth genera
Moths of Sri Lanka
Olethreutinae
Taxa named by Alexey Diakonoff